For 1986 in television, see:

1986 in Albanian television
1986 in American television
1986 in Australian television
1986 in Austrian television
1986 in Belgian television
1986 in Brazilian television
1986 in British television
1986 in Canadian television
1986 in Czech television
1986 in Danish television
1986 in Dutch television
1986 in Estonian television
1986 in French television
1986 in German television
1986 in Indonesian television
1986 in Irish television
1986 in Israeli television
1986 in Japanese television
1986 in New Zealand television
1986 in Norwegian television
1986 in Philippine television
1986 in Portuguese television
1986 in Scottish television
1986 in Singapore television
1986 in South African television
1986 in Swedish television